Bola Sete (born Djalma de Andrade; July 16, 1923 – February 14, 1987) was a Brazilian guitarist who played jazz with Vince Guaraldi and Dizzy Gillespie.

History 
Born Djama de Andrade in Rio de Janeiro, Sete was the only son of a family with seven children. His nickname means "Seven Ball".  In snooker, which is fairly popular in Brazil, the seven ball is the only black ball on the table (like the eight ball in pool).  Bola got this nickname when he was the only black member of a small jazz group.

Sete's family were poor and often struggled with finding food. Every member of the family played a musical instrument and would often play together. Sete first began playing music when he found a Cavaquinho in his home. With the help of his Uncle, he taught himself to play and eventually got his own instrument. For Christmas in 1932, he was gifted his first guitar.

At age 10, Sete was fostered by an affluent married couple who sent him to school and introduced him to classical music. He later began performing in a semi-professional group that played Brazilian folk music and samba. When World War II started, Sete's foster parents sent him into hiding in the Brazlilian interior to avoid military conscription. He returned to Rio after the end of the war.

Sete's foster parents wanted him to pursue a career in law, but he was set on becoming a musician and began studying guitar at the National School of Music in Rio. He then moved to a conservatory in Sao Paolo where the guitar teachers were superior. While studying, he started performing with local samba groups and his own sextet. His early influences were guitarists Django Reinhardt, Charlie Christian, Barney Kessel, George Van Eps, and Oscar Moore of the Nat King Cole Trio. He admired the big bands that were touring South America at that time, led by Dizzy Gillespie, Tommy Dorsey, and Woody Herman.

His career broadened between 1952 and '58 when he played clubs and hotels in Italy.  He then returned to Brazil and started touring throughout South America, during which time the manager of Sheraton Hotels noticed him and brought him to the US to play in the hotels. He played in New York's Park Sheraton, then moved to San Francisco to play in the Sheraton Palace. Dizzy Gillespie was staying there at the time and heard Sete playing every day. When Gillespie brought his pianist, Lalo Schifrin, to the hotel, he discovered that Schifrin and Sete had played together in Argentina. This meeting was the beginning of Sete's success in the US. In the fall of 1962, Gillespie took Sete to the Monterey Jazz Festival, where he enjoyed a huge reception.

Sete toured with Gillespie, then returned to San Francisco, where he joined the Vince Guaraldi trio. He became well known in the US, and his partnership with Guaraldi yielded several well-received recordings. After staying for a couple of years with Guaraldi, Sete formed his own trio with Sebastião Neto on bass and Paulinho da Costa on drums. He appeared at the Monterey Jazz Festival in 1966 with this trio and released an album of his performance, Bola Sete at the Monterey Jazz Festival, which peaked at No. 20 on the Billboard Jazz chart.

After a two year retirement, Sete returned to music in 1971. He often played a 13-stringed instrument he devised himself called the "lutar". The instrument was based on a Brazilian folk instrument, the alaude, which has ten strings grouped in five sets of double strings. The lutar had six sets of double strings and a single string.

In the 1970s, Sete became friends with guitarist John Fahey, who had been an admirer. In 1975, Sete's album Ocean was released on Fahey's label, Takoma Records.

Death 
During the 1980s, Sete suffered from lung cancer, which he attempted to improve with yoga and meditation. On February 14, 1987, he died at Marin General Hospital in Greenbrae, California of complications caused by pneumonia and cancer.

The compositions he recorded shortly before his death were compiled and released as Windspell in 2008.

Discography

 Aqui está o Bola Sete (Parlophone and Cornbread Records, 1957)
 Bola Sete e 4 trombones (Odeon Records, 1958)
 Travessuras do Bola Sete (Odeon Records, 1958)
 Ritmolândia (Odeon Records, 1958)
 Carnival in Rio (Puchito, 1958)
 Bola Sete em Hi-Fi (1958)
 É a Bola da Vez (Odeon Records, 1959)
 O Extraordinario Bola Sete (Odeon Records, 1962)
 Bossa Nova (Fantasy Records, 1962)
 Tour de Force (Fantasy Records, 1963)
 The Incomparable Bola Sete (1965)
 The Solo Guitar of Bola Sete (Fantasy Records, 1965)
 Autentico! (Fantasy Records, 1966)
 Workin' on a Groovy Thing (Paramount Records, 1970)
 Shebaba (Fantasy Records, 1971)
 Goin' to Rio (Columbia Records, 1973; reissued as Crystal Garden on Samba Moon Records, 2011)
 Ocean (Takoma Records, 1975)
 Jungle Suite (Dancing Cat Records, 1985; reissued as Shambhala Moon, 2001)
 The Kitchen Tapes (2014; originally recorded, 1959 to the 1980s; tracks 1 through 9 and 12 through 14 as home recordings; tracks 10 and 11 recorded live at San Francisco State College)

With Vince Guaraldi
 Vince Guaraldi, Bola Sete and Friends (Fantasy Records, 1963)
 From All Sides (Fantasy Records, 1964)
 Live at El Matador (Fantasy Records, 1966)
 Jazz Casual: Paul Winter/Bola Sete and Vince Guaraldi (Koch Records, 2001)
 The Navy Swings (V.A.G. Publishing, 2010)

As sideman
 New Wave (Philips Records, 1963), Dizzy Gillespie, featuring Lalo Schifrin

Compilation albums
 Ocean Memories (1999)
 Voodoo Village (2004)
 Windspell (Samba Moon Records, 2008)

Live albums
 Bola Sete at the Monterey Jazz Festival (Verve Records, 1967)
 Live at Grace Cathedral (Samba Moon, 2003)

References

External links

Anne Sete's Official Website
Bola Sete Discography at Discogs.com

1923 births
1987 deaths
Brazilian jazz guitarists
Brazilian male guitarists
Verve Records artists
Fantasy Records artists
20th-century guitarists
20th-century male musicians
Male jazz musicians